Lafayette Township is a township located in the Skylands Region of Sussex County, New Jersey, United States. As of the 2010 United States Census, the township's population was 2,538, reflecting an increase of 238 (+10.3%) from the 2,300 counted in the 2000 Census, which had in turn increased by 398 (+20.9%) from the 1,902 counted in the 1990 Census. The township is crossed by Route 15 and Route 94.

History
Lafayette was formed as a Township based on an Act of the New Jersey Legislature on April 14, 1845, from part of Frankford Township and Newton Township (the latter now dissolved), based on the results of a referendum held that same day. The township was the first in the country to be named for Gilbert du Motier, Marquis de Lafayette, the French general and statesman who served in the Continental Army during the American Revolutionary War.

Historic district

The Lafayette Village Historic District is a  historic district encompassing the village of Lafayette along NJ 15, Morris Farm Road and Meadows Road. It was added to the National Register of Historic Places on November 15, 2013 for its significance in architecture, exploration/settlement, industry, and transportation. The district includes 42 contributing buildings, a contributing structure, and three contributing sites.

The Lafayette Foundry was built where Morris Farm Road crosses the Paulins Kill in 1836 by Alexander Boyles. There are no visible remains at the site. The Lafayette Mill Complex on Morris Farm Road includes a flour and gristmill, storehouse and distillery on the south side; a general
store and playhouse on the north side. The Ludlum-Mabee House was built  and is now used by Lafayette Center Preservation Foundation.

Geography
According to the United States Census Bureau, the township had a total area of 17.97 square miles (46.54 km2), including 17.88 square miles (46.32 km2) of land and 0.09 square miles (0.23 km2) of water (0.48%).

Unincorporated communities, localities and place names located partially or completely within the township include Branchville Junction, Harmonyvale, Hopkins Corner, Warbasse and Warbasse Junction.

Lafayette Township borders the municipalities of Andover Township, Frankford Township, Hampton Township, Hardyston Township, Sparta Township and Wantage Township.

Demographics

Census 2010

The Census Bureau's 2006–2010 American Community Survey showed that (in 2010 inflation-adjusted dollars) median household income was $96,369 (with a margin of error of +/− $10,553) and the median family income was $98,750 (+/− $11,241). Males had a median income of $71,607 (+/− $22,034) versus $56,964 (+/− $13,270) for females. The per capita income for the borough was $34,364 (+/− $3,922). About 6.4% of families and 8.0% of the population were below the poverty line, including 12.7% of those under age 18 and none of those age 65 or over.

Census 2000

As of the 2000 United States Census there were 2,300 people, 771 households, and 647 families residing in the township.  The population density was 127.6 people per square mile (49.3/km2).  There were 799 housing units at an average density of 44.3 per square mile (17.1/km2).  The racial makeup of the township was 97.04% White, 1.04% African American, 0.09% Native American, 0.78% Asian, 0.35% from other races, and 0.70% from two or more races. Hispanic or Latino of any race were 2.35% of the population.

There were 771 households, out of which 38.1% had children under the age of 18 living with them, 73.4% were married couples living together, 7.5% had a female householder with no husband present, and 16.0% were non-families. 12.1% of all households were made up of individuals, and 3.6% had someone living alone who was 65 years of age or older.  The average household size was 2.95 and the average family size was 3.20.

In the township the population was spread out, with 27.4% under the age of 18, 5.3% from 18 to 24, 29.5% from 25 to 44, 28.6% from 45 to 64, and 9.3% who were 65 years of age or older.  The median age was 39 years. For every 100 females, there were 100.7 males.  For every 100 females age 18 and over, there were 97.7 males.

The median income for a household in the township was $82,805, and the median income for a family was $87,650. Males had a median income of $61,307 versus $38,816 for females. The per capita income for the township was $30,491.  About 1.2% of families and 3.7% of the population were below the poverty line, including 2.0% of those under age 18 and 2.3% of those age 65 or over.

Government

Local government
Lafayette Township is governed under the Township form of New Jersey municipal government, one of 141 municipalities (of the 564) statewide that use this form, the second-most commonly used form of government in the state. The Township Committee is comprised of five members, who are elected directly by the voters at-large in partisan elections to serve three-year terms of office on a staggered basis, with either one or two seats coming up for election each year as part of the November general election in a three-year cycle. At an annual reorganization meeting, the Township Committee selects one of its members to serve as Mayor.

, members of the Lafayette Township Committee are Mayor Kevin K. O'Leary (R, term on township committee ends December 31, 2024; term as mayor ends 2022), Deputy Mayor Richard Hughes (R, term on committee and as deputy mayor ends 2022), Richard Bruning (R, 2022), Gregory J. Corcoran (R, 2023) and Alan R. Henderson (R, 2023).

Federal, state and county representation
Lafayette Township is located in the 5th Congressional District and is part of New Jersey's 24th state legislative district.

 

Sussex County is governed by a Board of County Commissioners whose five members are elected at-large in partisan elections on a staggered basis, with either one or two seats coming up for election each year. At an annual reorganization meeting held in the beginning of January, the board selects a Commissioner Director and Deputy Director from among its members, with day-to-day supervision of the operation of the county delegated to a County Administrator. , Sussex County's Commissioners are 
Commissioner Director Anthony Fasano (R, Hopatcong, term as commissioner and as commissioner director ends December 31, 2022), 
Deputy Director Chris Carney (R, Frankford Township, term as commissioner ends 2024; term as deputy director ends 2022), 
Dawn Fantasia (R, Franklin, 2024), 
Jill Space (R, Wantage Township, 2022; appointed to serve an unexpired term) and 
Herbert Yardley (R, Stillwater Township, 2023). In May 2022, Jill Space was appointed to fill the seat expiring in December 2022 that had been held by Sylvia Petillo until she resigned from office.

Constitutional officers elected on a countywide basis are 
County Clerk Jeffrey M. Parrott (R, Wantage Township, 2026),
Sheriff Michael F. Strada (R, Hampton Township, 2022) and 
Surrogate Gary R. Chiusano (R, Frankford Township, 2023). The County Administrator is Gregory V. Poff II, whose appointment expires in 2025.

Politics

As of March 23, 2011, there were a total of 1,738 registered voters in Lafayette Township, of which 228 (13.1% vs. 16.5% countywide) were registered as Democrats, 781 (44.9% vs. 39.3%) were registered as Republicans and 727 (41.8% vs. 44.1%) were registered as Unaffiliated. There were 2 voters registered as Libertarians or Greens. Among the township's 2010 Census population, 68.5% (vs. 65.8% in Sussex County) were registered to vote, including 89.4% of those ages 18 and over (vs. 86.5% countywide).

In the 2012 presidential election, Republican Mitt Romney received 867 votes (65.7% vs. 59.4% countywide), ahead of Democrat Barack Obama with 431 votes (32.7% vs. 38.2%) and other candidates with 18 votes (1.4% vs. 2.1%), among the 1,319 ballots cast by the township's 1,815 registered voters, for a turnout of 72.7% (vs. 68.3% in Sussex County). In the 2008 presidential election, Republican John McCain received 921 votes (67.3% vs. 59.2% countywide), ahead of Democrat Barack Obama with 417 votes (30.5% vs. 38.7%) and other candidates with 18 votes (1.3% vs. 1.5%), among the 1,368 ballots cast by the township's 1,740 registered voters, for a turnout of 78.6% (vs. 76.9% in Sussex County). In the 2004 presidential election, Republican George W. Bush received 883 votes (67.4% vs. 63.9% countywide), ahead of Democrat John Kerry with 404 votes (30.8% vs. 34.4%) and other candidates with 18 votes (1.4% vs. 1.3%), among the 1,311 ballots cast by the township's 1,583 registered voters, for a turnout of 82.8% (vs. 77.7% in the whole county).

In the 2013 gubernatorial election, Republican Chris Christie received 76.5% of the vote (646 cast), ahead of Democrat Barbara Buono with 20.4% (172 votes), and other candidates with 3.1% (26 votes), among the 855 ballots cast by the township's 1,824 registered voters (11 ballots were spoiled), for a turnout of 46.9%. In the 2009 gubernatorial election, Republican Chris Christie received 635 votes (66.2% vs. 63.3% countywide), ahead of Democrat Jon Corzine with 214 votes (22.3% vs. 25.7%), Independent Chris Daggett with 94 votes (9.8% vs. 9.1%) and other candidates with 14 votes (1.5% vs. 1.3%), among the 959 ballots cast by the township's 1,702 registered voters, yielding a 56.3% turnout (vs. 52.3% in the county).

Education

Public school students in pre-kindergarten through eighth grade attend the Lafayette Township School District. As of the 2018–2019 school year, the district, comprised of one school, had an enrollment of 204 students and 22.7 classroom teachers (on an FTE basis), for a student–teacher ratio of 9.0:1.

For ninth through twelfth grades, public school students attend High Point Regional High School, which also serves students from Branchville, Frankford Township, Montague Township, Sussex Borough and Wantage Township (where the school is located). As of the 2018–2019 school year, the high school had an enrollment of 893 students and 81.9 classroom teachers (on an FTE basis), for a student–teacher ratio of 10.9:1. The district is governed by a nine-member board of education; seats on the board are allocated based on the population of the constituent municipalities, with one seat assigned to Lafayette Township.

Transportation

The main highways serving Lafayette Township are New Jersey Route 15 and New Jersey Route 94. The two routes run concurrently in opposite directions for a short stretch in Lafayette Township.

Notable people

People who were born in, residents of, or otherwise closely associated with Lafayette Township include:

 Andy Albeck (1921–2010), movie executive who served as president and chief executive of United Artists and operated the award-winning Albeck Family Christmas Tree farm in Lafayette Township
 Cleve Backster (1924–2013), interrogation specialist for the Central Intelligence Agency, best known for his 1960s experiments with plants using a polygraph which led to his theory of "primary perception" where he claimed that plants "feel pain" and have extrasensory perception
 Bhikkhu Bodhi (born 1944), Theravada Buddhist monk, ordained in Sri Lanka, who was appointed the second president of the Buddhist Publication Society
 Andrew J. Rogers (1828–1900), lawyer, teacher, clerk, police commissioner and Democratic Party politician who represented New Jersey's 4th congressional district in the United States House of Representatives from 1863 to 1867
 Jay Nelson Tuck (1916–1985), journalist, television critic who served as president of The Newspaper Guild from 1950 to 1952

References

Further reading
McCabe, Wayne T.; and Gordon, Kate. A Penny A View...An Album of Postcard Views...Lafayette, N.J. (Newton, NJ: Historic Preservation Alternatives, 1993).

External links

 Lafayette Township Official Website
 Sussex County webpage for Lafayette Township
 Lafayette Township School District
 
 School Data for the Lafayette Township School District, National Center for Education Statistics
 High Point Regional High School
 Sensations Magazine – Three-time winner, national American Literary Magazine Awards, now based in and hosting events in Lafayette, NJ
 

 
1845 establishments in New Jersey
Papakating Creek watershed
Populated places established in 1845
Township form of New Jersey government
Townships in Sussex County, New Jersey